The Miss Brazil 2010 pageant took place May 08, 2010, in the Memorial da América Latina in São Paulo. Each state and the Federal District competed for the title, won by Débora Lyra of Minas Gerais. She will represent the country at Miss Universe 2010. Miss Brazil International is Lílian Lopes Pereira  who will represent Brazil at Miss International 2010. Miss Brazil Continente Americano is Marylia Bernardt who will enter in Miss Continente Americano 2010.

Results

Placements

Special Awards
 Miss Internet: Francienne Pavesi
 Miss Congeniality: Nayane Pacheco
 Best National Costume: Débora Lyra

Contestants

 - Andréa Carvalho
 - Juliana Guimarães 
 - Andréia Silva
 - Lílian Lopes 
 - Rafaela Marques
 - Eugênia Justino 
 - Lidiane Matos 
 - Francienne Pavesi
 - Diennifer da Costa
 - Camila Ribeiro 
 - Juliete de Pieri
 - Kátia Talon 
 - Débora Lyra
 - Salcy Lima
 - Natália Taveira 
 - Marylia Bernardt
 - Luzielle Vasconcelos
 - Lanna Lopes
 - Thamíres Flazake
 - Joyce Oliver 
 - Bruna Jaroceski
 - Jeane Aguiar
 - Moara Barbosa
 - Aline Zermiani 
 - Karla Mandro
 - Nayane Pacheco 
 - Suymara Barreto

External links
 Official site (in Portuguese)

2010
2010 in Brazil
2010 beauty pageants